Brooklyn Community Board 3 is a New York City community board that encompasses the Brooklyn neighborhoods of Bedford-Stuyvesant, Stuyvesant Heights and Ocean Hill. It is delimited by Classon Avenue on the west, Flushing Avenue and Broadway on the north, and Saratoga Avenue on the east, as well as by Atlantic Avenue on the south.

Its current chairman is Richard Flateau, and its district manager is Henry Butler, president of the Vanguard Independent Democratic Association.

As of the 2000 U.S. Census, the Board covered a population of 143,387, up from 138,696 in 1990 and 133,377 in 1980. 
Of them (as of 2000), 2,056 (1.4%) are White non-Hispanic, 110,431 (76.8%) are African-American, 1,457 (1.0%) Asian or Pacific Islander, 432(0.3%) American Indian or Native Alaskan, 473 (0.3%) of some other race, 2,998 (2.1%) of two or more race, 26,020 (18.1%) of Hispanic origins.
44.9% of the population benefit from public assistance as of 2004, up from 32.7% in 2000.

References

External links
Profile of the Community Board (PDF)
Brooklyn neighborhood map

Community boards of Brooklyn
Bedford–Stuyvesant, Brooklyn